Anthony Tomlinson is an English professional boxer, and the brother of footballer Antwoine Hackford.

References

1990s births
Living people
English boxers